Freadelpha amoena is a species of beetle in the family Cerambycidae. It was described by Westwood in 1841. It is known from the Republic of the Congo, the Democratic Republic of the Congo, and Ghana.

References

Sternotomini
Beetles described in 1841
Beetles of the Democratic Republic of the Congo
Insects of the Republic of the Congo
Insects of West Africa